B. arvensis may refer to:

 Bromus arvensis, the field brome, a grass species native to Europe and Asia
 Buglossoides arvensis, a synonym for Lithospermum arvense

See also
 Arvensis (disambiguation)